Platanthera elongata is a species of orchid known by the common names denseflower rein orchid, chaparral orchid and wood rein-orchid. It is native to western North America from British Columbia and Montana to southern California, where it grows in mountain forests and scrub habitat. This orchid grows erect to about 1.3 meters in maximum height from a bulbous caudex, its stem becoming narrow toward the tip. The basal leaves are up to 30 centimeters long by 6.5 wide. Leaves higher on the stem are much reduced. The upper part of the stem is a spikelike inflorescence of many small green flowers which are sometimes densely arranged. They are sometimes faintly and variably fragrant in the evenings. The spur on each flower may be up to 1.5 centimeters long.

References

External links 

 
 Jepson Manual Treatment
 USDA Plants Profile
 Flora of North America
 Photo gallery

elongata
Orchids of Canada
Orchids of the United States
Orchids of California
Flora of British Columbia
Flora of the West Coast of the United States
Flora of Montana
Flora of the Cascade Range
Flora of the Klamath Mountains
Flora of the Sierra Nevada (United States)
Natural history of the California chaparral and woodlands
Natural history of the California Coast Ranges
Natural history of the Channel Islands of California
Natural history of the Peninsular Ranges
Natural history of the San Francisco Bay Area
Natural history of the Santa Monica Mountains
Natural history of the Transverse Ranges
Flora without expected TNC conservation status